The 2006 Xerox Super Cup was held on 25 February 2006 between the 2005 J. League champions Gamba Osaka and the 2005 Emperor's Cup winner Urawa Red Diamonds. Urawa won the Trophy after winning the match 3–1.

Match details

See also
2005 J. League Division 1
2005 Emperor's Cup

References

Japanese Super Cup
Super
Urawa Red Diamonds matches
Gamba Osaka matches
Sports competitions in Tokyo